The 2022 IFSC Climbing World Cup is the 34th edition of the international sport climbing competition series organised by the International Federation of Sport Climbing (IFSC), held in 12 locations. There are 21 events: six bouldering, seven lead, seven speed, and one bouldering & lead combined events. The series began on 8 April in Meiringen, Switzerland with the first bouldering competitions of the season, and concluded on 22 October in Morioka-Iwate, Japan, which introduced the Boulder & Lead combined format that will be used at the 2024 Summer Olympics in Paris.

The top 3 in each competition receive medals, and the overall winners are awarded trophies. At the end of the season, an overall ranking is determined based upon points, which athletes are awarded for finishing in the top 30 of each individual event.

Scheduling 
The IFSC announced the 2022 World Cup schedule in October 2021. The series was initially scheduled to open in Moscow instead of the traditional curtain-raiser in Meiringen, Switzerland, and repeats the back-to-back events held in Salt Lake City, introduced in the 2021 series The IFSC followed up in December 2021 with an announcement of Koper, Slovenia as a first-time host city, a change from the traditional host city of Kranj, Slovenia which hosted a World Cup event 25 times between 1996 and 2021, as well as Wujiang as the last stop in the circuit.

On 25 February 2022, the IFSC announced the suspension of the Boulder and Speed World Cup in Moscow scheduled for April, following the Russian invasion of Ukraine. On 22 March 2022, the federation announced that the suspended Moscow Boulder World Cup event was rescheduled to take place in Brixen, Italy from 10 to 12 June 2022.

On 24 March 2022, the IFSC announced that the World Cup originally scheduled to take place in Bali, Indonesia, would now take place in Jakarta.

On 20 May 2022, the IFSC announced the cancellation of two World Cup events in China, Wujiang (Lead & Speed) from 30 September to 2 October and Chongqing (Lead & Boulder) from 6 to 9 October, citing concerns over the COVID-19 pandemic.

Later in May, the federation announced that the Boulder World Cup event originally scheduled for Japan in May would be rescheduled as a Boulder & Lead World Cup in Morioka-Iwate, Japan from 20 to 22 October. This would be the first IFSC event to feature the Boulder & Lead combined format that will be used at the 2024 Summer Olympics in Paris.

In July, the IFSC announced a Lead & Speed World Cup to take place 9 to 11 September in Edinburgh, to replace the previously canceled Wujiang World Cup. Edinburgh had most recently hosted a World Cup in 2017.

Overview

Competition highlights
In the speed competition at the Seoul World Cup on 6 May, Indonesia's Kiromal Katibin and Poland's Aleksandra Mirosław set the world record for their respective genders' at 5.17 seconds and 6.64 seconds, respectively. Two weeks later, Katibin and Mirosław broke their own records in Salt Lake City, at 5.10 seconds and 6.53 seconds, respectively. Katibin broke his own record twice on 30 June during the qualifying round at Villars, posting times of 5.09, and then 5.04 seconds. He broke his record again on 8 July at Chamonix with a time of 5.009.

Natalia Grossman of the United States repeated her women's bouldering overall series win with five straight gold medals, only missing the gold when she finished second to Janja Garnbret of Slovenia, who sat out most of the bouldering season. Yoshiyuki Ogata of Japan also repeated as the overall bouldering series winner, and he was joined by fellow Japanese climbers Tomoa Narasaki with the silver and Kokoro Fujii with the bronze, completing a Japanese sweep of the bouldering series podium.

At Innsbruck in June, Colin Duffy of the United States won both the bouldering and lead gold medals, becoming the first male athlete to win both disciplines in the same IFSC World Cup event.

Bouldering 
The overall ranking is determined based upon points, which athletes are awarded for finishing in the top 40 of each individual event. The end-of-season standings are based on the sum of points earned from the five best finishes for each athlete. Results displayed (in brackets) are not counted. The national ranking is the sum of the points of that country's three best male and female athletes.

Men 
The results of the ten most successful athletes of the Bouldering World Cup 2022:

Women 
The results of the ten most successful athletes of the Bouldering World Cup 2022:

* = Joint place with another athlete

Speed 

The overall ranking is determined based upon points, which athletes are awarded for finishing in the top 40 of each individual event. There were seven competitions in the season. The national ranking is the sum of the points of that country's three best male and female athletes. Results displayed (in brackets) are not counted.

Men 
The results of the ten most successful athletes of the Speed World Cup 2022:

Women 
The results of the ten most successful athletes of the Speed World Cup 2022:

* = Joint place with another athlete

Lead 
The overall ranking is determined based upon points, which athletes are awarded for finishing in the top 40 of each individual event. There were seven competitions in the season. The national ranking is the sum of the points of that country's three best male and female athletes. Results displayed (in brackets) are not counted.

Men 
The results of the ten most successful athletes of the Lead World Cup 2022:

Women 
The results of the ten most successful athletes of the Lead World Cup 2022:

* = Joint place with another athlete

Medal table

References

IFSC Climbing World Cup
World Cup
Sports events affected by the 2022 Russian invasion of Ukraine